The Tunisia men's national under-21 volleyball team, nicknamed Les Aigles de Carthage (The Eagles of Carthage or The Carthage Eagles), represents Tunisia in international volleyball competitions and friendly matches. The team is one of the leading nations in men's volleyball on the African continent, with ten-time African Championship.

Results
 Champions   Runners up   Third place   Fourth place

Red border color indicates tournament was held on home soil.

FIVB Volleyball Men's U21 World Championship

African Volleyball Championship U21

Arab Junior Volleyball Championship

See also
Tunisia men's national volleyball team
Tunisia men's national under-23 volleyball team
Tunisia men's national under-19 volleyball team
Tunisia women's national volleyball team
Tunisian Volleyball Federation

References

External links
FIVB profile

Volleyball
National men's under-21 volleyball teams
Volleyball in Tunisia
Men's sport in Tunisia